Wurmbea recurva is a tuberous plant in the family Colchicaceae, native to the south-west Cape Province, South Africa.

It was first described by the Swedish botanist Rune Bertil Nordenstam in 1986.

References

recurva
Plants described in 1986